Henry Willis House, also known as Ehle House, is a historic home located near Penland, Mitchell County, North Carolina.  It was built about 1880, and enlarged about 1890.  It is a double-pen log house, with a weatherboarded log ell added after the turn of the 20th century.  It was enlarged again about 1930 and in the 1980s.  Also on the property is a contributing privy.  It is one of the three traditional log homesteads in Mitchell County.

It was added to the National Register of Historic Places in 1988.

References

Log houses in the United States
Houses on the National Register of Historic Places in North Carolina
Houses completed in 1890
Houses in Mitchell County, North Carolina
National Register of Historic Places in Mitchell County, North Carolina
Log buildings and structures on the National Register of Historic Places in North Carolina